Streptomyces roseicoloratus is a bacterium species from the genus of Streptomyces which has been isolated from soil from a cotton field from Xinjiang in China.

See also 
 List of Streptomyces species

References 

roseicoloratus
Bacteria described in 2020